Raw Radar War is an American hardcore punk band formed in Boston in 2002.

Biography
Raw Radar War, formerly called Septic Youth Command, was formed by Jonah Jenkins in 2002, after the Milligram's disbanding. The band title, Raw Radar War, is a palindrome, it can be read from both sides with equal meaning.

Members
Current
 Jonah Jenkins - vocals
 Charles Corey - bass guitar
 Mike Cahill - drums
 Pat Tapia - guitar
 Mario Travers - guitar

Former
 Scott Gallagher - guitar
 Quinn Matt Dillon - guitar

Discography

EPs

7" singles
2007
 Pharmacopoeia : Volume One (5 × 7" vinyl - box set compilation) limited pressing of 250 copies (Land o' Smiles)

 Raw Radar War/Deadbird split (from Pharmacopoeia : Volume One) limited pressing of 50 copies (Land o' Smiles)
  

2011
 On A Field Of White (Chainsaw Safety Records)

Compilation appearances
2010
 This Is Good: A Tribute To Black Flag limited edition of 98 copies, on cassette only (Land o' Smiles)
Have contributed with track "Spraypaint" - 0:55

2017
  Death Kiss: Volume 1 CD and online (Death Kiss V.1 on Bandcamp)
contributed with track "Pride Of The Ignorant" - 02:07

References

External links
Raw Radar War on Spirit Of Metal
Raw Radar War on Encyclopaedia Metallum
Raw Radar War on Deaf Sparrow
Raw Radar War on Teeth of the Divine
Raw Radar War on Hellride Music
Interview with Jonah Jenkins at Deaf Sparrow
Jonah Jenkins interview at Asice.net

Hardcore punk groups from Massachusetts
Heavy metal musical groups from Massachusetts
American sludge metal musical groups
American doom metal musical groups
American crust and d-beat groups
Musical groups from Boston
2002 establishments in Massachusetts
Musical groups established in 2002